Painting in the Americas before European colonization is the Precolumbian painting traditions of the Americas. Painting was a relatively widespread, popular and diverse means of communication and expression for both religious and utilitarian purpose throughout the regions of the Western Hemisphere. During the period before and after European exploration and settlement of the Americas; including North America, Central America, South America and the islands of the Caribbean, the Bahamas, the West Indies, the Antilles, the Lesser Antilles and other island groups, indigenous native cultures produced a wide variety of visual arts, including painting on textiles, hides, rock and cave surfaces, bodies especially faces, ceramics, architectural features including interior murals, wood panels, and other available surfaces. Many of the perishable surfaces, such as woven textiles, typically have not been preserved, but Precolumbian painting on ceramics, walls, and rocks have survived more frequently.

The oldest known paintings in the South America are the cave paintings of Caverna da Pedra Pintada, in the Brazilian Amazon rainforest that date back 11,200 years. The earliest known painting in North America is the Cooper Bison Skull found near Fort Supply, Oklahoma, dated to 10,200 BCE.

Painting in the Americas before colonization

Each continent of the Americas hosted societies that were unique and individually developed cultures; that produced totems, works of religious symbolism, and decorative and expressive painted works. African influence was especially strong in the art of the Caribbean and South America. The arts of the indigenous people of the Americas had an enormous impact and influence on European art and vice versa during and after the Age of Exploration. Spain, Portugal, France, The Netherlands and England were all powerful and influential colonial powers in the Americas during and after the 15th century. By the 19th century cultural influence began to flow both ways across the Atlantic.

Mesoamerica

The murals of Teotihuacan that adorn the archaeological site (and others, like the Wagner Murals, found in private collections) and from hieroglyphic inscriptions made by the Maya describing their encounters with Teotihuacano conquerors are the source of most of what is understood about that ancient civilization.  The painting of the murals, perhaps thousands of them, reached its zenith between 450 and 650 CE.  The painters' artistry was unrivalled in Mesoamerica and has been compared with that of Florence, Italy.

The Great Goddess
A series of murals were found in the Tepantitla compound in Teotihuacan. In 1942, archaeologist Alfonso Caso identified the central figures as a Teotihuacan equivalent of Tlaloc, the Mesoamerican god of rain and warfare.  During the 1970s researcher Esther Pasztory re-examined the murals and concluded that many paintings of "Tlaloc" instead showed a feminine deity, an analysis based on a number of factors including the gender of accompanying figures, the green bird in the headdress, and the spiders seen above the figure.  Pasztory concluded that the figures represented a vegetation and fertility goddess that was a predecessor of the much later Aztec goddess Xochiquetzal.

The Great Goddess has since been identified at locations other than Tepantitla – including Teotihuacan's Tetitla compound, the Palace of the Jaguars, and the Temple of Agriculture – as well as on several vessels.

The Temple of the Murals

Large painted Mayan murals were found in the archaeological site Bonampak, in the Mexican state of Chiapas near the border with Guatemala. What is referred to as The Temple of the Murals is a long narrow building with 3 rooms atop a low-stepped pyramid base. The interior walls preserve the finest examples of classic Maya painting. Huge paintings cover the walls of one of the structure's three rooms. The paintings show the story of a single battle and its victorious outcome.

South America

Nazca culture
The Nazca culture of Peru produced painted pottery and painted ceramics depicting religious and symbolic characters as well as imagery of personages within the culture. They produced in addition to ceramics, highly complex textiles and Geoglyphs. The period from 1-700 A.D is generally considered when this group thrived. Modern knowledge about the culture of the Nazca is built upon the study of Cahuachi the ceremonial center from (1-500 AD).

North America

United States
Main: Native American art

In the area now part of the United States, many different and diverse Native American tribes of people created painting and ornamental painted objects of a large variety. The oldest known example is the Cooper Bison skull, which was painted with a red zigzag circa 10,200 BCE in present-day Oklahoma. Body painting, rock art, hide painting flourished in ancient North America, as well as painting on ceramics, textiles, and other surfaces.

Ancestral Puebloans (Anasazi) of the American Southwest have a longstanding tradition of painting interior murals and ceramics, as did the Mogollon culture, ancestors of Zuni and Hopi tribes, who lived in an area near the Gila Wilderness. The Fremont culture of Utah are known for their abundant rock paintings throughout Utah, particularly those at Range Creek Canyon. The Patayan typically painted ceramics with a red slip. The Hohokam, ancestors of the Akimel O'odham and Tohono O'odham, are known for their red-on-buff painted ceramics. Casa Grande Ruins National Monument is the best known monument of Hohokam culture.

Native Americans in California created many pieces and environments of rock art. The most elaborate and artistic painted pictographs being the Rock art of the Chumash people, and petroglyphs those of the Coso people in the Coso Rock Art District.

Ancient Northwest Coast art features formline painting on woven items and wood; however, few of these items survived the centuries the temperate rainforest climate.

Canada

Caribbean

See also

Art history
Aztec clothing
Cascajal Block
Indigenous peoples of the Americas
History of painting
History of the Americas
List of indigenous artists of the Americas
Ledger art
Maya script
Mississippian culture
Native American art
Native Americans in the United States
Plains hide painting
Timeline of Native American art history
Visual arts by indigenous peoples of the Americas
Western art
Western painting
Pictogram

References

Sources
Millon, Clara; Millon, Rene; Pasztory, Esther; Seligman, Thomas K. (1988) Feathered Serpents and Flowering Trees: Reconstructing the Murals of Teotihuacan, Kathleen Berrin, ed., Fine Arts Museum of San Francisco.
Dale M. Brown ed. Lost Civilizations: The Magnificent Maya. Alexandria, Virginia: Time-Life books, 1993.
Carol Kaufmann. 2003. "Maya Masterwork". National Geographic December 2003: 70-77.
Constantino Reyes-Valerio, "De Bonampak al Templo Mayor, Historia del Azul Maya en Mesoamerica", Siglo XXI Editores, 1993.
Davies, Nigel (1982). The Ancient Kingdoms of Mexico. England: Penguin Books. .

Leibsohn, Dana, and Barbara E. Mundy, “Making Sense of the Pre-Columbian,” Vistas: Visual Culture in Spanish America, 1520-1820 (2015). http://www.fordham.edu/vistas.

External links
 Web page of the Maya Blue Pigment
 Maya Art with Photos   
 "Hieroglyphs and History at Copán" article by Mayanist epigrapher David Stuart at the Peabody Museum    
 Teotihuacan Research Guide, academic resources and links, maintained by Temple University
 Teotihuacán Photo Gallery
 Mesoamerican Photo Archives: Teotihuacán, by David Hixson
 Teotihuacan Mural Art: Assessing the Accuracy of its Interpretation

Pre-Columbian art
Mesoamerican art
Indigenous painting of the Americas
History of indigenous peoples of the Americas
Americas